This article is one of a series providing information about endemism among birds in the world's various zoogeographic zones. For an overview of this subject, see Endemism in birds.

Patterns of endemism
New Caledonia has a single endemic family, the Rhynochetidae.

Endemic Bird Areas
Birdlife International has defined the whole of New Caledonia—the main island of Grande Terre, the Loyalty Islands (Ouvéa, Lifou and Maré), the Île des Pins and other smaller surrounding islands—as an Endemic Bird Area (EBA).

List of species
The following is a list of species endemic to New Caledonia. Except where indicated, the species is only found on Grande Terre.

 White-bellied goshawk
 †Powerful goshawk
 †Gracile goshawk
 New Caledonian rail
 †New Caledonian gallinule
 Kagu
 †Lowland kagu
 Cloven-feathered dove
 New Caledonian imperial pigeon
 †New Caledonian ground dove
 New Caledonian lorikeet
 Horned parakeet - found on Grande Terre and Ouvéa
 New Caledonian owlet-nightjar
 †New Caledonian barn owl
 New Caledonian cuckooshrike
 New Caledonian grassbird
 Yellow-bellied robin
 New Caledonian whistler
 Large Lifou white-eye - found only on Lifou
 Green-backed white-eye - found on Grande Terre and Maré
 Small Lifou white-eye - found only on Lifou
 New Caledonian myzomela
 New Caledonian friarbird - found on Grande Terre, Lifou and Maré
 Crow honeyeater
 Barred honeyeater
 Red-throated parrotfinch
 Striated starling - found on Grande Terre, Ouvéa, Lifou and Maré
 New Caledonian crow - native only on Grande Terre, but introduced on Maré

The following restricted-range species are also found in this EBA:

 Red-bellied fruit dove
 Melanesian cuckooshrike
 Long-tailed triller
 Fan-tailed gerygone
 Southern shrikebill
 Melanesian flycatcher
 Streaked fantail
 Cardinal myzomela
 Dark-brown honeyeater

New Caledonia
'
'